The Pharmasave Gimli Classic was a bonspiel, or curling tournament, that took place at either the Gimli Curling Club or the Gimli Recreation Centre in Gimli, Manitoba. It was part of the Manitoba Curling Tour and sometimes part of the World Curling Tour. It ran from at least 2002 to 2009, and has not been held since.

The 2012 event was scheduled to be held from February 3 to 5 as part of the 2011–12 World Curling Tour, but was cancelled.

Past champions
''Only skip's name is displayed.

External links
Gimli Curling Club Home Page

References

Former World Curling Tour events
Gimli, Manitoba
Curling in Manitoba